Math Horizons is a magazine aimed at undergraduates interested in mathematics, published by the Mathematical Association of America. It publishes expository articles about "beautiful mathematics" as well as articles about the culture of mathematics covering mathematical people, institutions, humor, games, cartoons, and book reviews.

The MAA gives the Trevor Evans Awards annually to "authors of exceptional articles that are accessible to undergraduates" that are published in Math Horizons.

Notes

Further reading

External links

Math Horizons at JSTOR
Math Horizons at Taylor & Francis Online

Mathematics journals